Luisa (minor planet designation: 599 Luisa) is a minor planet orbiting the Sun.

References

External links
 
 

Postrema asteroids
Luisa
Luisa
S-type asteroids (Tholen)
K-type asteroids (SMASS)
19060425